The envelope system, also known as the envelope budgeting method, is a popular method for visualizing and maintaining a flexible budget.  The key idea is to prioritize cash income to meet separate categories of household expenses in physically separate envelopes.


Usage

Typically, the person will write the name and average cost per month of a bill on the front of an envelope.  Then, either once a month or when the person gets paid, they will put the amount for that bill in cash in the envelope.  When the bill is due, the money is taken out to pay for that bill.

This prevents the person from spending the money out of their pocket or bank account, because it is already allocated to the bill.

This strategy can be adapted to multiple checking accounts, too, in lieu of envelopes. Or by using budgeting software based on the envelope system.

See also
Participatory budgeting
Personal budget
Programme budgeting
Zero-based budgeting

References

Budgets
Personal finance